La Vie Eco is a weekly francophone Moroccan independent newspaper.

History and profile
La Vie Éco was established in 1957. The weekly is based in Casablanca and is published by Media Groupe characteres, a media company of the Akwa.

The newspaper specializes in economic and financial news.

References

External links
 Official Site (in French)

1957 establishments in Morocco
Newspapers established in 1952
Newspapers published in Morocco
Business newspapers
French-language newspapers published in Morocco
Weekly newspapers
Mass media in Casablanca